Bonnie is  a village located in the southern part of Jefferson County, Illinois.  Bonnie had a population of 397 in the 2010 census, down from 424 in the 2000 census. It is part of the Mount Vernon Micropolitan Statistical Area.

History 

The first settlement in this area was Spring Garden, about four miles southeast of Bonnie.  There were several springs in the area.  Early in the 19th century, Uriah Compton walled them up and built a resort called "Compton's Springs".  In 1848, the village of Spring Garden was platted next to the resort.  Spring Garden grew rapidly, becoming the second largest settlement in the County, even having a high school by 1888.  In 1905, however, the Chicago and Eastern Illinois Railroad was built about three miles to the west.  Spring Garden began a long decline as the business and population shifted to the rail depots at Bonnie and Ina.  George Washington Hayes (1842–1927) donated some of the land originally making up Bonnie.

The Bonnie Campground is located to the west of Bonnie.  This campground has been the scene of large religious outdoor gatherings since late in the 19th century.

Geography

Demographics

As of the 2010 US Census, Bonnie had 397 people.  Among non-Hispanics this includes 387 White (97.5%), 3 African-American, 2 Native American, & 3 from two or more races.  The Hispanic or Latino population included 2 people.

There were 177 households, out of which 39 had children under the age of 18 living with them, 98 were married couples living together, 4 had a female householder with children & no husband present, and 56 were non-families. 49 households were made up of individuals, and 49 had someone who was 65 years of age or older. The average household size was 2.24 and the average family size was 2.72.

The median age 45.4 years. 

As of the census of 2000, there were 424 people, 177 households, and 129 families residing in the village.  The population density was 343.8 people/mi2 (133.1 people/km).  There were 196 housing units at an average density of 158.9 units/mi2 (61.5 units/km).  The racial makeup of the village was 97.17% White, 0.0% African American, 1.65% Native American, 0.0% Asian, 0.0% Pacific Islander, 0.0% from other races, and 1.18% from two or more races.  Approximately 0.47% of the population was Hispanic or Latino of any race.

There were 177 households in which 27.1% had children under the age of 18 years living with them, 65.5% were married couples living together, 6.8% had a female householder with no husband present, and 26.6% were non-families.  Approximately 21.5% of all households were made up of individuals, and 11.9% had someone living alone who was 65 years of age or older.  The average household size was 2.4 people and the average family size was 2.77 people.

In the village, the population was spread out, with 20.8% under the age of 18 years, 9.0% from 18 to 24 years old, 27.4% from 25 to 44 years old, 26.2% from 45 to 64 years old, and 16.7% who were 65 years of age or older.  The median age was 40 years.  For every 100 females, there were 90.1 males.  For every 100 females age 18 years old and older, there were 95.3 males.

The median income for a household in the village was $27,768 and the median income for a family was $29,554.  Males had a median income of $31,389 versus $19,375 for females.  The per capita income for the village was $13,998.  Approximately 9.7% of the population and 9.6% of families were below the poverty line.   Approximately 6.0% of those under the age of 18 years and 11.8% of those 65 years old and older were living below the poverty line.

References

External links
Village of Bonnie

Villages in Jefferson County, Illinois
Villages in Illinois
Mount Vernon, Illinois micropolitan area
Populated places established in 1905
1905 establishments in Illinois

it:Bonnie
hu:Bonnie
tl:Bonnie